The 1986 Lehigh Engineers football team was an American football team that represented Lehigh University during the 1986 NCAA Division I-AA football season. In the first year of play for the Colonial League, Lehigh tied for second place.  

In their first year under head coach Hank Small, the Engineers compiled a 5–6 record. Mike Kosko and Joe Uliana were the team captains.

Lehigh's 2–2 conference record tied for second in the five-team Colonial League standings. Against all opponents, the Engineers were outscored 300 to 258.

Lehigh played its home games at Taylor Stadium on the university's main campus in Bethlehem, Pennsylvania.

Schedule

References

Lehigh
Lehigh Mountain Hawks football seasons
Lehigh Engineers football